The Battle of Tzeki, Cixi, or Tsz'kí was fought between British and Chinese forces in Tzeki (Cixi), Zhejiang province, China on 15 March 1842 during the First Opium War.

References

Citations

Bibliography
Bulletins of State Intelligence. Westminster: F. Watts. 1842.

1842 in China
Battles of the First Opium War
Conflicts in 1842
March 1842 events